The Debed or Debeda is a river in Armenia and Georgia. It also serves as a natural boundary between Armenia and Georgia at the village Sadakhlo, Georgia.

The river originates in Armenia and is formed at the confluence of the Dzoraget and Pambak. It ends in Georgia where it feeds into the Khrami, a tributary of Kura.

See also

List of lakes of Armenia
Geography of Armenia
Geography of Georgia

References

Rivers of Armenia
Rivers of Georgia (country)
International rivers of Asia
International rivers of Europe
Armenia–Georgia (country) border
Border rivers